Jameson Fisher (born February 6, 1995) is an American professional baseball outfielder who is a free agent.

Career
Fisher attended Zachary High School in Zachary, Louisiana. He was drafted by the Chicago Cubs in the 24th round of the 2012 Major League Baseball Draft, but declined to sign a minor league contract and instead attended Southeastern Louisiana University where he played college baseball.

He began college baseball playing catcher and first baseman. After tearing the labrum in his right shoulder, he underwent surgery and missed the 2015 season. In the following season as a senior, Fisher led the NCAA in hitting with a .424 batting average, 11 home runs, and 66 RBIs. He also scored 49 runs and stole 15 bases. Over his college career, Fisher had a batting average of .375 with 14 homers and 132 RBIs, stealing 32 stolen bases. In 2014, he played collegiate summer baseball with the Cotuit Kettleers of the Cape Cod Baseball League.

Fisher was drafted in the fourth round with the 116th overall pick in the 2016 MLB draft by the Chicago White Sox. Fisher spent the 2016 season in rookie-level baseball with the Great Falls Voyagers of the Pioneer League, finishing with a .342 batting average, four home runs and 25 RBIs over 187 at-bats. He was promoted to the Kannapolis Intimidators of the A-level South Atlantic League to start the 2017 season. There he played 60 games before being promoted to the Winston-Salem Dash of the high-A Carolina League, where he finished the 2017 season. During the year, he posted a combined .245 batting average with a .342 on-base percentage and a .402 slugging percentage. He was released on May 19, 2022.

References

External links

Living people
1993 births
People from Baton Rouge, Louisiana
Baseball players from Louisiana
Southeastern Louisiana Lions baseball players
Great Falls Voyagers players
Kannapolis Intimidators players
Winston-Salem Dash players
Birmingham Barons players
Cotuit Kettleers players